Jerzy Lewandowski is a Polish theoretical physicist who studies quantum gravity. He is a professor of physics at the University of Warsaw.

Lewandowski received his doctorate in Warsaw under Andrzej Trautman. He worked closely with Abhay Ashtekar at Pennsylvania State University in the 1990s on the mathematical justification of Loop Quantum Gravity (LQG). Among other things, he was at the Erwin Schrödinger Institute in Vienna and at the Max Planck Institute for Gravitational Physics in Golm near Potsdam.

He dealt with cosmological models and the entropy of black holes in the LQG. In 2010 he and his colleagues investigated a scalar field together with the gravitational field as part of LQG and were able to show the origin of a time as the ratio of the scalar to the gravitational field, and the quantization of the gravitational field.

Publications 

 With Ashtekar Background independent quantum gravity: a status report, Classical and Quantum Gravity, Band 21, 2004, R 53 Arxiv
 Abhay Ashtekar, Jerzy Lewandowski, Donald Marolf, Jose Mourao, Thomas Thiemann Quantization of diffeomorphism invariant theories of connections with local degrees of freedom, J. Mathematical Physics, Band 36, 1995, S. 6456–6493, Arxiv
 With Ashtekar Quantum theory of Gravity I. Area Operators, Classical and Quantum Gravity, Band 14, 1997, A 55-82,  Arxiv, Volume II: Volume Operators, Arxiv
 With Martin Bojowald, Ashtekar Mathematical structure of loop quantum cosmology, Adv.Theor.Math.Phys., Band 7, 2003, S. 233-268, Arxiv

External links 

 Professor Jerzy Lewandowski

References 

Date of birth missing (living people)
Polish relativity theorists
Loop quantum gravity researchers
Academic staff of the University of Warsaw
Living people
Year of birth missing (living people)